Hemovanadin is a pale green vanabin protein found in the blood cells, called vanadocytes, of ascidians (sea squirts) and other organisms (particularly sea organisms). It is one of the few known vanadium-containing proteins. The German chemist  Martin Henze first detected vanadium in ascidians (sea squirts) in 1911. Unlike hemocyanin and hemoglobin, hemovanadin is not an oxygen carrier.

References

Metalloproteins
Blood proteins
Vanadium compounds
Ascidiacea